María Luisa Godoy Ibáñez (born 18 March 1980) is a Chilean journalist and television presenter. She is currently the host of the TVN program Muy buenos días.

Professional career
María Luisa Godoy's television debut was as a press journalist on Mega. After that, she hosted the morning news on La Red.

She remained in this role for three years, until the channel decided to replace the show's hosts. She also hosted the Festival del Huaso de Olmué twice.

In early 2016, Godoy debuted on Buenos Días a Todos as part of a trio of hosts with Karen Doggenweiler and Javiera Contador. However, she soon left to take charge of the afternoon show Por ti with Cristián Sánchez, which was canceled due to low ratings.

In 2017, after the resignation of Javiera Contador, she returned to TVN's morning show, now called Muy buenos días.

Personal life
She is the sister of former deputy .

In 2010 she began a relationship with lawyer Ignacio Rivadeneira (son of Ricardo Rivadeneira), whom she married in 2012. They have three daughters.

Television programs
  (2008)
  (2009–2012)
  (2011–2012)
  (2012)
  (2012–2013)
  (2014)
  (2014)
 Buenos Días a Todos (2016)
  (2016–present)
 Por ti (2016)
 Muy buenos días (2017–present)
 Viña del Mar International Song Festival (2019–2022)

References

External links

 

1980 births
Chilean television journalists
Chilean television presenters
Chilean women journalists
Chilean television personalities
Living people
People from Santiago
Women television journalists
Chilean women television presenters